Andrew Aw Yong Rei (born 29 March 2003) is a Singaporean professional footballer who plays as a right back for Singaporean club Tampines Rovers. In addition to playing as a right back, Andrew is able to play right wingback and right midfield.

In 2018, he was one of the eight promising youngsters from the FAS Football Academy who was shortlisted for the TNP Dollah Kassim Award.

Career statistics

Club

References

2003 births
Living people
Singaporean footballers
Association football midfielders
Singapore Premier League players
Albirex Niigata Singapore FC players
Singaporean sportspeople of Chinese descent